Already Home may refer to:

 "Already Home" (Jay Z song)
 "Already Home" (Thousand Foot Krutch song)
 "Already Home", a 2014 song by A Great Big World on Is There Anybody Out There?